Harmanec is a village and municipality in Banská Bystrica District in the Banská Bystrica Region of central Slovakia.

History
The village first appears in historical records circa 1540.

Geography
The municipality lies at an altitude of 486 metres and covers an area of 7.757 km². It has a population of about 918 people.

Sights
The village is located close to the Harmanec Cave.

References

External links
 https://www.harmanec.sk/

Villages and municipalities in Banská Bystrica District